FlyArystan is a low-cost airline based in Almaty, Kazakhstan. It is the wholly owned low cost subsidiary of Air Astana, the country's leading airline. FlyArystan's foundation was approved by Air Astana's joint shareholders, Samruk-Kazyna Sovereign Wealth Fund and BAE Systems PLC, and was endorsed by Kazakhstan's President Nursultan Nazarbayev, on 2 November 2018.  The company slogan is Say YES! to Travel

History
FlyArystan's sales commenced on 29 March 2019 on its website. The airline flew its first flights on 1 May 2019 with services from its hub airport, Almaty International Airport.

Peter Foster, President and CEO of Air Astana, was quoted at a press conference in Almaty on 6 November 2018 as saying that FlyArystan is “on the one hand a response to demand for lower airfares in a more competitive local market, on the other, a recognition of the huge opportunity for low cost air travel throughout Central Asia and the Caucasus”.

Awards
In November 2022 FlyArystan was recognised as a 4-star airline by SkyTrax. FlyArystan is one of only 5 LCCs to be assessed as 4-star.

Destinations

As of June 2020, FlyArystan serves 16 destinations. FlyArystan's first flight was on 1 May 2019, from Almaty to Nur-Sultan. On 13 December 2019, the airline launched its first international flight from Nur-Sultan to Moscow (ZIA) using an Airbus A320-200 aircraft which was earlier used by Air Astana.

Fleet

Current fleet
FlyArystan operates a standardised fleet of Airbus A320 family aircraft with a 180 seat layout. FlyArystan's A320NEOs have a 188 seat layout to maximise seat capacity in line with LCC principles.
 

FlyArystan plans to grow its fleet to 19 planes by the end of 2023.

References

Airlines of Kazakhstan
Airlines established in 2018
Low-cost carriers
https://skytraxratings.com/flyarystan-is-certified-as-a-4-star-low-cost-airline